Academica Futebol Club also known as AFC, is an American soccer organizations founded in Cheshire, CT in 2003.

History
AFC was founded in 2003 and has grown to a soccer organization with a youth academy, boys and girls clubs, a minor league team, and a team in the Women's Premier Soccer League known as the New England Mutiny.

American Indoor Soccer League
In 2003 AFC fielded a team known as Connecticut Academica F.C. in the inaugural season of the American Indoor Soccer League, and also playing in the 2004–2005 winter Premier Arena Soccer League season.

Year-By-Year

References

External links
 Official site of the Academica FC

Defunct indoor soccer clubs in the United States
Soccer clubs in Connecticut
American Indoor Soccer League teams
2003 establishments in Connecticut
2005 disestablishments in Connecticut
Association football clubs established in 2003
Association football clubs disestablished in 2005
Cheshire, Connecticut